Rand Flem-Ath (born c. 1949 as Rand Fleming) is a Canadian librarian and author known for his numerous books about the lost continent of Atlantis and the theory of Earth Crustal Displacement. His views are influenced by Charles Hapgood and in turn influenced Graham Hancock's Fingerprints of the Gods.

Personal
Rand Flem-Ath was born Rand Fleming, but when he married Rose De'ath they adopted the joint surname Flem-Ath.

Books 

  (originally published in 1995 as When the Sky Fell: In Search of Atlantis)

References

External links 

 

Atlantis proponents
Canadian librarians
Canadian non-fiction writers
Writers from British Columbia
Living people
Place of birth missing (living people)
Year of birth missing (living people)